True Tori is an American  docu-series starring Tori Spelling and Dean McDermott. It premiered on April 22, 2014, on Lifetime. The series ostensibly chronicles the couple's life from three weeks after McDermott left for rehab and highlights the apparent uncertainty of their marriage due to an alleged affair. The first season consists of 8 episodes.

The series has been renewed for a second 8-episode season, which premiered on October 21, 2014. The second season continued to focus on Tori and Dean's failing marriage as they try to rebuild their relationship and make decisions that would be the best for them and their four children. Tori tries to find her "true self" and ways how to juggle between her family relationships and business ventures.

Episodes

Season 1 (2014)

Season 2 (2014)

References

External links

 
 
 

2010s American reality television series
2014 American television series debuts
2014 American television series endings
English-language television shows
Lifetime (TV network) original programming
Television series by All3Media
Spelling family